Telecommunications in Antigua and Barbuda are via media in the telecommunications industry. This article is about communications systems in Antigua and Barbuda.

Telephone
Telephones – main lines in use: 37,500 (2006)
country comparison to the world: 168

Telephones – mobile cellular: 110,200 (2006) (APUA PCS, Cable & Wireless, Digicel)
country comparison to the world: 177

Telephone system:
domestic: good automatic telephone system
international: 3 fiber optic submarine cables (2 to Saint Kitts and 1 to Guadeloupe); satellite earth station – 1 Intelsat (Atlantic Ocean)

Radio
Radio broadcast stations: AM 4, FM 6, shortwave 0 (2002)

Radios: 36,000 (1997)

Television
Television broadcast stations: 2 (1997) (including ABS-TV)

Televisions: 31,000 (1997)

Internet
Internet Service Providers (ISPs): Cable & Wireless, Antigua Computer Technologies (ACT), Antigua Public Utilities Authority (APUA INET)

Internet hosts: 2,215 (2008)
country comparison to the world: 140

Internet users: 60,000 (2007)
country comparison to the world: 158

Country codes: AG

Demographics

See also
Antigua and Barbuda
History of telecommunication
List of telecommunications terminology
Outline of telecommunication

References

External links
 Antigua and Barbuda, SubmarineCableMap.com

 
Antigua and Barbuda
Antigua